Abd al-Tawab Mullah Huwaysh (born 14 March 1942) is a former Iraqi politician and member of the Arab Socialist Ba'ath Party, and served as deputy prime minister and minister of military industrialization until the occupation of Iraq in 2003.

Career
He was on the list of Iraqis most wanted by the United States. He was arrested by an American force that carried out an airdrop on his house in Al-Adhamiya district in Baghdad on May 2, 2003, and he was released in 2006.  It is believed that he currently resides in Germany.

References

1942 births
Living people
Arab Socialist Ba'ath Party – Iraq Region politicians
Most-wanted Iraqi playing cards
Iraqi military personnel
Iraq War prisoners of war
Iraqi prisoners of war